Nyl Kiyoshi Yakura (born 14 February 1993) is a Canadian badminton player. Yakura competed at the 2018 Commonwealth Games. He won a gold and a silver at the 2019 Lima Pan American Games in the men's and mixed doubles events respectively. Yakura, who grew up in Pickering, currently lives in Toronto and trains at the KC Badminton Club in Markham.

Career 
In June 2021, Yakura was named to Canada's Olympic team. Competing in the men's doubles event with Jason Ho-Shue, his pace was stopped in the group stage.

Achievements

Pan American Games 
Men's doubles

Mixed doubles

Pan Am Championships 
Men's doubles

Mixed doubles

Pan Am Junior Championships 
Boys' singles

Boys' doubles

Mixed doubles

BWF International Challenge/Series (4 titles, 4 runners-up) 
Men's doubles

Mixed doubles

  BWF International Challenge tournament
  BWF International Series tournament
  BWF Future Series tournament

References

External links 
 
 

1993 births
Living people
Sportspeople from Scarborough, Toronto
Canadian people of Japanese descent
Canadian male badminton players
Badminton players at the 2020 Summer Olympics
Olympic badminton players of Canada
Badminton players at the 2018 Commonwealth Games
Badminton players at the 2022 Commonwealth Games
Commonwealth Games competitors for Canada
Badminton players at the 2019 Pan American Games
Pan American Games gold medalists for Canada
Pan American Games silver medalists for Canada
Pan American Games medalists in badminton
Medalists at the 2019 Pan American Games